Magdalenka may refer to the following places:
Magdalenka, Kuyavian-Pomeranian Voivodeship (north-central Poland)
Magdalenka, Piotrków County in Łódź Voivodeship (central Poland)
Magdalenka, Gmina Będków in Łódź Voivodeship (central Poland)
Magdalenka, Lublin Voivodeship (east Poland)
Magdalenka, Masovian Voivodeship (east-central Poland)